Disconeura inexpectata is a moth of the family Erebidae first described by Walter Rothschild in 1910. It is found in Peru.

References

Phaegopterina
Moths described in 1910